Sitaleki Maka (born 6 December 1985) is a professional boxer.

Maka is currently the New Zealand Champion (NZNBF Version) in the Super Lightweight division. Maka fought the biggest fight in his career in China in December 2016 against Baishanbo Nasiyiwula for the interim WBA International super lightweight title. Maka suffered his first defeat in this bout by unanimous decision.

Maka biggest win in his career was against Farzan Ali Jr in Fiji in May 2016. Maka took the fight on late notice, due to Anthony Taylor who was the original opponent pulled out due to sickness. Maka won the bout when Ali Jr retired after the 2nd round.

Professional boxing titles
New Zealand National Boxing Federation 
New Zealand National Super Lightweight Title (139Ibs)

Professional boxing record

Controversy
In 2006, Maka was involved in a brawl incident which include teenagers at an Auckland park. Maka himself stated he was not involved in the brawl as he was in a parked car, tired from the gym earlier in the day. Maka was founded guilty on three charges of assault and was sentenced to 375 hours community service. Before being sentence, Maka was released on bail to represent Tonga in the Melbourne Commonwealth games, however due to the conviction he was denied entry to Australia.

References

1985 births
Living people
New Zealand professional boxing champions
New Zealand male boxers
Fighters trained by Lolo Heimuli